Love Joey 2 is Joey Yung's second compilation/greatest hits album, named after her very successful first compilation album, Like Joey. This album includes 14 past hits and 3 new songs. Her 14 past hits includes not only her famous ballads/"k-songs" like 痛愛, 誰來愛我, and 啜泣, but also includes popular upbeat songs like 隆重登場 and 未知 (Cantonese version of Jennifer Paige's Crush). The new songs consists of the popular chart topping ballad, 爭氣, the themesong to her movie "Demi-Haunted" (with Eason Chan), as well as the upbeat song 電我. This album later on became one of 2002's top ten selling albums.

Track listing
爭氣 Well Deserved Success
電我 Shock Me
特別嘉賓 Special Guest
痛愛 Painful Love
怯 Timid
抱抱 Hug 
啜泣 Weeping
未知 Unknown
隆重登場 Solemn on Stage
全身暑假 All Summer Holiday
再見我的初戀 Goodbye My First Love
告解 Confession
阿門 Amen
逃避你 Evade You
何苦 Buy Why?
誰來愛我 Who Will Love Me?
這分鐘更愛你 Love You Even More This Minute

Joey Yung albums
2002 compilation albums